Diocese of Auckland may refer to:

 Anglican Diocese of Auckland, a geographical area of the Anglican Church, in New Zealand
 Roman Catholic Diocese of Auckland, a geographical area of the Roman Catholic Church, in New Zealand